An Evening with Dolly Parton started in North America in 2006, and continued in Europe in 2007, and was finished in North America the same year.

History

After taking nearly all of 2006 off from touring to focus on other projects, Parton returned with a new stage show in November for a few select concerts as she prepared for a 2007 European tour. The 17 initial dates for the tour "across the pond" were announced to the public for the first time in October 2006. She performed four more shows on the West Coast in early 2007 to hone the show for its European premiere. After the European leg, Parton performed for three nights at a Niagara Falls Casino and at a benefit concert to raise money for a new hospital in her hometown.

Although Parton had said after returning from Europe that a three-month U.S. tour would be coming with the release of her next CD Backwoods Barbie, those plans were pushed back to 2008.

The show

The shows were similar in vein to Parton's previous tours, her 2004 Hello I'm Dolly Tour and 2005's The Vintage Tour. Sets were similar except for the fact that Parton entered via hydraulic lift.

When the show premiered in Europe, an intermission was added so that it became a two-act show, appropriately titled "An Evening With Dolly Parton."

Fans speculated that tracks from Parton's upcoming album Backwoods Barbie would be showcased but that was not the case. Instead "I Dreamed About Elvis", last used on the Hello I'm Dolly Tour was included and in Europe, tracks from her most recent studio album Those Were the Days were spotlighted.

Set list
North America

The following set list is representative of the November 16, 2006 show in Uncasville, Connecticut . It is not representative of all concerts for the duration of the tour.

"Baby I'm Burnin'"
"Two Doors Down"
"Jolene"
"Puppy Love"
"The Grass Is Blue"
"Shine"
"Thank God I'm A Country Girl"
"God's Coloring Book"
"Little Sparrow"
"My Tennessee Mountain Home'
"Coat of Many Colors"
"Marry Me" / "Applejack"
"Love Is Strange"
"Islands In The Stream"
"Here You Come Again"
"Crimson and Clover"
"Me and Bobby McGee"
"9 to 5"
"I Dreamed About Elvis"
"I Will Always Love You"

Encore

Europe

The following set list is representative of the March 6, 2007 show in Horsens, Denmark . It is not representative of all concerts for the duration of the tour.

"Baby I'm Burnin'"
"Two Doors Down"
"Jolene"
"Puppy Love"
"The Grass Is Blue"
"Shine"
"Thank God I'm a Country Girl"
"Little Sparrow"
"My Tennessee Mountain Home"
"These Old Bones"
"Coat of Many Colors"
"Smoky Mountain Memories"
"Train, Train"
"Imagine"
"Travelin' Prayer"
"Marry Me" / "Applejack"
"God's Coloring Book"
"Me and Bobby McGee"
"Crimson and Clover"
"I Dreamed About Elvis "
"Islands In the Stream"
"Here You Come Again"
"9 to 5"
"I Will Always Love You"

Encore

Notes:
In Karlstad, "I Will Always Love You" and "Imagine" switched places.
"Puppy Love" was dropped from the set list after the performance in Stockholm.
"Imagine" was dropped after the Sheffield show.
"Travelin' Prayer" was dropped after the Zwolle show.
After the Gothenborg show, "Crimson and Clover" was replaced with "Those Were the Days".
"Turn! Turn! Turn! (To Everything There is a Season)" was performed from March 13 to 20, 2007.
"We Irish" was performed during shows in Dublin and Belfast.

Tour dates

Cancelled shows

Personnel

The Mighty Fine Band
Band Leader, Guitar: Kent Wells
Drums: Steve Turner
Piano: Paul Hollowell
Fiddle: Jay Weaver
Dobro, Guitar: Richie Owens
Banjo: Bruce Watkins
Keyboard: Michael Davis 
Background vocals: Jennifer O'Brien, Vicki Hampton & Richard Dennison

Other Staff
Dolly Parton's Personal Tour Manager: Don Warden
Tour Manager: Dave Fowler
Production Assistant: Levi Kennedy
Director, Staging & Choreography: Steve Summers
Lighting Designer:  Justin Kitchenman
Stage Manager & Security: Danny Nozzell
Merchandising: Ira Parker

References

 Dollymania

2007 concert tours
Dolly Parton concert tours